Vermilion Bay is a bay in southern Louisiana in the United States.

Vermilion Bay is located in southwestern Iberia Parish and southeastern Vermilion Parish. It is an inlet of the Gulf of Mexico, to which it is connected to the south by a narrow strait called Southwest Pass; Marsh Island and a portion of the Louisiana mainland in southeastern Vermilion Parish otherwise separate it from the Gulf of Mexico.  On the east, Vermilion Bay connects directly to West Cote Blanche Bay.

Notes

References
Webster's New Geographical Dictionary. Springfield, Massachusetts: Merriam-Webster, Inc., 1984. .

Bays of Louisiana
Bodies of water of Iberia Parish, Louisiana
Bodies of water of Vermilion Parish, Louisiana
Estuaries of Louisiana